Dendrobium formosum (beautiful giant-flowered dendrobium) is a species of orchid.

It is native to the Himalayas (Nepal, Bhutan, Assam, India, Bangladesh), northern Indochina (Thailand, Myanmar, Vietnam) and the Andaman Islands, and widely cultivated elsewhere as an ornamental.

References

External links

formosum
Orchids of Asia
Flora of the Indian subcontinent
Flora of Indo-China
Orchids of Myanmar
Orchids of India
Orchids of Thailand
Orchids of Vietnam
Plants described in 1830